Beatnik is a distortion of the Beat Generation into a media stereotype.

Beatnik may also refer to::

Beatnik, a technology company founded by musician Thomas Dolby
Beatnik satellite, a Sputnik-99 satellite launch aborted by Swatch in 1999
Beatniks (novel), a 1997 novel by British author Toby Litt
"Beatnik" (The Buggles song), a 1982 song by The Buggles
"Beatnik" (The Clean song), a 1982 song by The Clean
Los Beatniks, Argentine rock garage group
The Beatniks (band), Japanese musical duo
The Beatniks (film), a 1960 drama film